The Christian Universalist Church of America is a small non-creedal denominational body created in 1964 in Deerfield Beach, Florida  as a result of the merger between the Universalist Church of America with the American Unitarian Association in 1961. The Christian Universalist Church of America teaches and promotes the doctrine of Universal Reconciliation. The church ceased to exist in 1967  at which time it claimed 200 churches and missions in 21 states with more than 15,000 members  and was reestablished in 2001 in the state of Indiana first as the Universalist Church, then as the Universalist Congregations of North America and then back to its original and current name. The Church subscribes to the Winchester Profession of Faith.

Winchester Profession of Faith

I. We believe that the Holy Scriptures of the Old and New Testaments contain a revelation of the character of God and of the duty, interest and final destination of mankind.

II. We believe that there is one God, whose nature is love, revealed in one Lord Jesus Christ, by one Holy Spirit of Grace, who will finally restore the whole family of mankind to holiness and happiness.

III. We believe that holiness and true happiness are inseparably connected, and that believers ought to be careful to maintain order and practice good works; for these things are good and profitable unto men.

Conditions of Fellowship
The acceptance of the essential principles of the Universalist faith, to wit:
The universal fatherhood of God.
The spiritual authority and leadership of His son, Jesus Christ.
The trustworthiness of the Bible as containing a revelation from God.
The certainty of just retribution for sin.
The final harmony of all souls with God.

Biblical Support for Universal Salvation

All people will see God's salvation (Luke 3:6).
And I, when I am lifted up from the earth, I will draw all people to myself (John 12:32).
For as in Adam all die, so also in Christ shall all be made alive (I Corinthians 15:22).
Every knee will bow and every tongue will confess that Jesus is Lord (Philippians 10-11).
For to this end we toil and strive, because we have our hope set on the living God, who is the Savior of all people, especially of those who believe (I Timothy 4:10).
For the grace of God has appeared, bringing salvation for all people... (Titus 2:11).

References

Further reading
Ballou, Hosea (1902) A Treatise on Atonement, Universalist Publishing House, Boston. 
Bressler, Ann Lee (2001)The Universalist Movement in America, 1770-1880, Oxford University Press.
Cassara, Ernest (1997) Universalism in America: A Documentary History of a Liberal Faith, Skinner House Books, Boston.
Church, Forrest (2010) The Cathedral of the World: A Universalist Theology, Beacon Press, Boston.
Miller, Russell (1979) The Larger Hope, The First Century of the Universalist Church in America, 1770-1870, Unitarian-Universalist Association, Boston.
Miller, Russell (1986) The Larger Hope, The Second Century of the Universalist Church in America, 1870-1970, Unitarian-Universalist Association, Boston.
Pearson, Carlton (2009) The Gospel of Inclusion, Atria Books, New York City.

External links
Official website 
Universalism, the Prevailing Doctrine 

 Christian denominations founded in the United States